W. H. Oakes (died 1890) was a music publisher in 19th-century Boston, Massachusetts. He published compositions by Daniel Auber, Henry Russell and others.

History 
Although details of his life remain scarce, ample evidence exists to show that William Oakes engraved and published many works of music throughout the 1840s. He usually employed outside printers, and distributed his publications through other vendors. Oakes seems to have borne responsibility for selecting the musical work, securing copyright permissions, hiring artists to create cover images, and arranging other logistics. Oakes himself engraved the musical notations.

In 1840 Oakes and Samuel Swan formed a publishing company, Oakes & Swan. The short-lived firm published musical works such as The Lament of the Irish Emigrant by William R. Dempster, and The Land of the Blest by J.P. Knight. Swan left the partnership by January, 1841.

For several years Oakes maintained an office on Tremont Street. Oakes served in 1841 as a trustee of the Music Institute. In 1844, the Massachusetts Charitable Mechanic Association selected three examples of Oakes' music engravings to exhibit at Quincy Hall.

Selected publications 
 L. Schumann, composer. The Flora Waltzes. 1843.
 James G. Maeder, composer. Teddy O'Neale. 1843.
 Francis H. Brown, composer. Soldier's Dream Polka. 1849.
 Francis H. Brown, composer. Song My Mother Sings. 1849.

References

Further reading 
 Catalogue of vocal and instrumental music, for sale by William H. Oakes, music engraver & publisher, no. 13 Tremont Row, Boston. Boston: Samuel N. Dickinson, printer, 52 Washington Street, 1840.

External links 

 WorldCat. Oakes, William H. d. 1890
 Nineteenth Century American Sheet Music Collection at the UNC-Chapel Hill Music Library. Includes works published by Oakes.
  William Dempster's Lament of the Irish emigrant, 1840
 Davis' quick step, 1841.
 E.L. White's Oh! that I had wings, 1843.
 Edward L. White's The Aeolian, 1845.
 American Antiquarian Society. H.K. Sweetland's The Ploughboy, A Rural Song, 1848.
 Cover of Fleurs d'ete, 1849.
 Friedrich Muller's Tyrolese Melodies, in papers of S.E. Thoreau.

Images 

American music publishers (people)
19th-century American businesspeople
Businesspeople from Boston
1890 deaths
Year of birth missing